Blandine Pont (born 28 November 1998) is a French judoka. She is the gold medallist in the -48 kg at the 2021 Judo Grand Prix Zagreb

References

External links
 
 
 

1998 births
Living people
French female judoka
21st-century French women